Copacabana Hotel Residência is a hotel in Copacabana, Rio de Janeiro, Brazil, located at Rua Barata Ribeiro 222. It contains apartments which have self-service facilities, 120 suites in total.

Reception
The hotel is usually sought by guests who are looking for larger rooms. Lonely Planet says "the recently renovated apartments all have tile (fake wood) floors, with a kitchen, a lounge room and a bedroom in back. The rooms are spacious enough, however the cheap furnishings don't add to the allure."

References

Hotels in Rio de Janeiro (city)
Copacabana, Rio de Janeiro